Podhorní Újezd a Vojice is a municipality in Jičín District in the Hradec Králové Region of the Czech Republic. It has about 600 inhabitants.

Administrative parts
The municipality is made up of villages of Podhorní Újezd and Vojice.

References

Villages in Jičín District